Pool C of the 2014 Women's Rugby World Cup is composed of France, Australia, South Africa and Wales.

Australia vs South Africa

France vs Wales

Australia vs Wales

France vs South Africa

Wales vs South Africa

Australia vs France

Notes

Pool C
2014–15 in Welsh rugby union
2014–15 in French rugby union
2014 in Australian rugby union
2014 in South African rugby union
rugby union
rugby union